Coverciano is a city quartiere in the southeastern part of Florence, Italy.

The neighborhood is bordered by the Affrico and Mensola streams, by the slopes of the hills and by the Via Aretina. It is best known for the two parish churches (the church of Santa Maria in Coverciano and the church dedicated to St. Catherine of Siena), the Centro Tecnico Federale di Coverciano of the FIGC, the Museo del Calcio, the headquarters of the Italian Referees Association section of Florence and the sports judge of Florence.

References

Districts of Florence